<div style="float: right; font-size: smaller; background-color:#E6E6FA; padding: 12px; margin-left: 5em; margin-bottom: 2em; width: 180px" align="center">
14h StLFCA Awards
December 17, 2017

Best Film: <big>The Shape of Water</big>

Best Director: Guillermo del ToroThe Shape of Water
</div>

The nominees for the 14th St. Louis Film Critics Association Awards were announced on December 10, 2017. The winners were announced on December 17, 2017.

Winners and nominees

Best Film
 The Shape of Water
 Get Out
 Lady Bird
 The Post
 Three Billboards Outside Ebbing, Missouri

Best Actor
 Gary Oldman – Darkest Hour
 Daniel Day-Lewis – Phantom Thread
 James Franco – The Disaster Artist
 Tom Hanks – The Post
 Daniel Kaluuya – Get Out

Best Supporting Actor
 Richard Jenkins – The Shape of Water
 Willem Dafoe – The Florida Project
 Woody Harrelson – Three Billboards Outside Ebbing, Missouri
 Sam Rockwell – Three Billboards Outside Ebbing, Missouri
 Michael Shannon – The Shape of Water

Best Original Screenplay
 The Shape of Water – Guillermo del Toro and Vanessa Taylor The Big Sick – Emily V. Gordon and Kumail Nanjiani
 Get Out – Jordan Peele
 Lady Bird – Greta Gerwig
 Three Billboards Outside Ebbing, Missouri – Martin McDonagh

Best Cinematography
 Blade Runner 2049 – Roger Deakins Darkest Hour – Bruno Delbonnel
 Dunkirk – Hoyte van Hoytema
 The Shape of Water – Dan Laustsen
 Wonder Wheel – Vittorio Storaro

Best Editing
 Baby Driver – Jonathan Amos and Paul Machliss Darkest Hour – Valerio Bonelli
 Dunkirk – Lee Smith
 The Post – Sarah Broshar and Michael Kahn
 The Shape of Water – Sidney Wolinsky

Best Production Design
 The Shape of Water – Paul D. Austerberry Beauty and the Beast – Sarah Greenwood
 Blade Runner 2049 – Dennis Gassner
 Dunkirk – Nathan Crowley
 Phantom Thread – Mark Tildesley

Best Foreign Language Feature
 Land of Mine
 First They Killed My Father
 Frantz
 Graduation
 The Square

Best Animated Feature
 Coco
 Captain Underpants: The First Epic Movie
 Despicable Me 3
 The Lego Batman Movie
 Loving VincentBest Director
 Guillermo del Toro – The Shape of Water Greta Gerwig – Lady Bird
 Jordan Peele – Get Out
 Steven Spielberg – The Post
 Denis Villeneuve – Blade Runner 2049

Best Actress
 Frances McDormand – Three Billboards Outside Ebbing, Missouri
 Sally Hawkins – The Shape of Water
 Saoirse Ronan – Lady Bird
 Kristen Stewart – Personal Shopper
 Meryl Streep – The Post

Best Supporting Actress
 Laurie Metcalf – Lady Bird
 Hong Chau – Downsizing
 Holly Hunter – The Big Sick
 Kristin Scott Thomas – Darkest Hour
 Octavia Spencer – The Shape of Water

Best Adapted Screenplay
 The Disaster Artist – Scott Neustadter and Michael H. Weber (Screenplay); Greg Sestero and Tom Bissell (Book) Call Me by Your Name – James Ivory (Screenplay); André Aciman (Novel)
 It – Chase Palmer, Cary Fukunaga, and Gary Dauberman (Screenplay); Stephen King (Novel)
 Molly's Game – Aaron Sorkin (Screenplay); Molly Bloom (Book)
 Mudbound – Virgil Williams and Dee Rees (Screenplay); Hillary Jordan (Novel)

Best Visual Effects
 Blade Runner 2049
 Beauty and the Beast
 Dunkirk
 The Shape of Water
 War for the Planet of the Apes

Best Score
 Phantom Thread – Jonny Greenwood Blade Runner 2049 – Benjamin Wallfisch and Hans Zimmer
 Dunkirk – Hans Zimmer
 The Post – John Williams
 The Shape of Water – Alexandre Desplat

Best Soundtrack
 Baby Driver
 Atomic Blonde
 Coco
 Guardians of the Galaxy Vol. 2
 Three Billboards Outside Ebbing, Missouri

Best Documentary Feature
 Jane
 City of Ghosts
 Last Men in Aleppo
 Never Say Goodbye: The KSHE Documentary
 Whose Streets?

Best Scene
 The Disaster Artist – Sixty-seven takes of "I did not hit her"
 Atomic Blonde – Stairwell fight
 Baby Driver – Baby (Ansel Elgort) goes for coffee (opening credits)
 Call Me By Your Name – Mr. Perlman's (Michael Stuhlbarg) closing monologue
 Lady Bird – Chalk talk for 'The Tempest'

Multiple nominations and awards

These films had multiple nominations:

 12 nominations: The Shape of Water
 6 nominations: Lady Bird, The Post, Three Billboards Outside Ebbing, Missouri
 5 nominations: Blade Runner 2049, Dunkirk
 4 nominations: Darkest Hour, Get Out
 3 nominations: Baby Driver, The Disaster Artist, Phantom Thread
 2 nominations: Atomic Blonde, Beauty and the Beast, The Big Sick, Call Me by Your Name, Coco

These films had multiple wins:

 5 wins: The Shape of Water
 2 wins: Baby Driver, Blade Runner 2049, The Disaster Artist

References

External links
 Official website

2017
2017 film awards
2017 in Missouri
St Louis